Lenard Larry McKelvey (born June 29, 1978), known professionally as Charlamagne tha God or simply Charlamagne, is an American radio host and television personality. He is a co-host of the nationally syndicated radio show The Breakfast Club with DJ Envy; whom he was inducted into the Radio Hall of Fame with in 2020 for their work on the show. He also hosts the late-night talk show Hell of A Week with Charlamagne tha God on Comedy Central.

Prior to his work on The Breakfast Club, he worked as a radio personality for several radio stations and also spent time as second mic on The Wendy Williams Experience with Wendy Williams on VH1. He is the founder of the Black Effect Podcast Network, and was featured on Guy Code, Guy Court and Girl Code. He was also a VJ for The Week in Jams with DJ Envy and Sofi Green. In 2015, McKelvey began hosting the MTV2 show Uncommon Sense.

In the shock jock tradition, one of McKelvey's personal mantras is "bite my tongue for no one"; he was called "hip-hop's Howard Stern" by Rolling Stone magazine.

Early life 
McKelvey was born to Larry Thomas McKelvey, a Jehovah's Witness-turned-Muslim and his wife, an English teacher and Jehovah's Witness, on June 29, 1978. He grew up in Moncks Corner, South Carolina where as a teenager he was arrested twice for Possession with Intent to Distribute marijuana and cocaine.

When McKelvey was arrested a third time, after being near a (non-fatal) shooting, his father refused to pay his bail money. After 41 days in jail, he asked his mother to pay for bail, at which point his father decided to "give him another chance". After his release, McKelvey began attending night school and graduated from Berkeley High School (in Moncks Corner).

In 2001, McKelvey was accused of sexual assault after a party. He denied having sexual relations with the accuser and cooperated with the authorities, providing DNA evidence which failed to support the claim that he had had sex with the victim. The sexual assault charges were dropped and he later pled guilty to a misdemeanor count of Contributing to the Delinquency of a Minor, for which he received three years probation.

Career

Early career in radio 
McKelvey started his career in radio as an intern for Z93 Jamz in Charleston. He also spent time in Columbia with WHXT. He left South Carolina in 2006 to become second mic to radio host Wendy Williams. He devised the stage name of "Charlamagne", derived from his street name as a drug dealer, "Charles," and developed a new persona based on Charlemagne (aka Charles the Great), who ruled much of Western Europe circa 800 A.D. He added "Tha God" because it "sounded cool."

His forward questioning and interviews of hip hop and R&B artists on radio raised his public profile, but also caused rifts between himself and the guests of the show. The show was taken off the air in 2008 and he was laid off. Relations between Charlamagne and Williams deteriorated, though he has stated numerous times on the show The Breakfast Club that he views Williams as a mentor, and the two reunited in 2019.

In 2008 he began hosting the morning show for 100.3 The Beat in Philadelphia. He was fired by the station in 2009, a few days after airing an interview with Beanie Sigel, who had released a diss track about Jay-Z, both of whom were former rappers for Roc-A-Fella Records. Speculation in the media was that Jay-Z was behind the firing of McKelvey due to the interview. He returned to Moncks Corner to live with his mother for about a year prior to being offered a position with WWPR-FM to co-host The Breakfast Club.

2010–2016: The Breakfast Club and television 
In 2010, McKelvey became a co-host on The Breakfast Club, alongside DJ Envy and Angela Yee on WWPR-FM in New York City, along with its national television simulcast on Revolt. The show was started by Power 105.1 to compete with Hot 97, one of the most popular hip-hop morning shows in New York. He was brought in as a co-host due to his radio experience and knowing "how to get to the edge and not go over it." Once part of the show, he gave himself the title "Prime Minister of Pissing People Off, the Architect of Aggravation, and the Ruler of Rubbing People the Wrong Way."

In 2011, McKelvey began serving as a cast member of Guy Code, a comedy television show on MTV2 that talks about a special code of conduct just for men. The show ended in March 2015. He also starred on the MTV2 show Charlamagne & Friends. He co-hosted MTV New Year's live from Times Square in both 2013 and 2014, and in 2015 he was a correspondent for the 2015 MTV Video Music Awards pre-show.

In 2014, he was dubbed "hip-hop's Howard Stern" by Rolling Stone magazine. The following year, he began hosting Uncommon Sense with Charlamagne tha God on MTV2.

2017–present: Book writing, podcast, and Radio Hall of Fame 
In 2017, his book Black Privilege: Opportunity Comes to Those Who Create It, which he called "a self-help guide for the hood," was published by the Simon & Schuster imprint Touchstone. Steven Kurutz of The New York Times gave the book a mostly positive review, describing Black Privilege as "a street-smart self-help guide" with typically blunt advice offered in eight different principles. The book was ranked sixth in the May 7, 2017, New York Times list of best-selling hardback non-fiction. McKelvey's second book, Shook One: Anxiety Playing Tricks on Me was released on October 23, 2018.

In 2019, he became the host of Emerging Hollywood, a YouTube series from The Hollywood Reporter. On this show, he speaks with Hollywood professionals to discuss various political topics. His past guests on the show include Trevor Noah and Jameela Jamil.

In 2020, McKelvey founded the Black Effect Podcast Network in partnership with iHeartMedia. In August 2020, he and his Breakfast Club co-hosts, Angela Yee and DJ Envy, were inducted into the Radio Hall of Fame. With fellow MTV2 personality Andrew Schulz, he hosts The Brilliant Idiots podcast on Combat Jack's Loud Speakers Network.

McKelvey became the host of the late-night talk show Tha God's Honest Truth in 2021.

Discography 
 South Crack: The Album (2008)

Film and TV credits

References

External links 
 

21st-century African-American people
African-American radio personalities
American people of Bissau-Guinean descent
American people of Mende descent
American people of Mandinka descent
Shock jocks
MTV people
Hip hop people
American podcasters
Radio personalities from New York City
People from Moncks Corner, South Carolina
1978 births
Living people
20th-century African-American people